Airbnb, Inc. is an American San Francisco-based company operating an online marketplace for short-term homestays and experiences. The company acts as a broker and charges a commission from each booking. The company was founded in 2008 by Brian Chesky, Nathan Blecharczyk, and Joe Gebbia. Airbnb is a shortened version of its original name, AirBedandBreakfast.com. The company is credited with revolutionizing the tourism industry however it has also been the subject of intense criticism by residents of tourism hotspot cities like Barcelona, Venice, etc. for enabling an unaffordable increase in home rents, and for a lack of regulation.

History

After moving to San Francisco in October 2007, roommates and former schoolmates Brian Chesky and Joe Gebbia came up with the idea of putting an air mattress in their living room and turning it into a bed and breakfast. In February 2008, Nathan Blecharczyk, Chesky's former roommate, joined as the Chief Technology Officer and the third co-founder of the new venture, which they named AirBed & Breakfast. They put together a website that offered short-term living quarters and breakfast for those who were unable to book a hotel in the saturated market. The site Airbedandbreakfast.com officially launched on August 11, 2008. The founders had their first customers in the summer of 2008, during the Industrial Design Conference held by Industrial Designers Society of America, where travelers had a hard time finding lodging in the city.

After the founders raised $30,000 by selling cereal named after the two candidates of the 2008 United States presidential election, Barack Obama and John McCain, mostly at the 2008 Democratic National Convention, computer programmer Paul Graham invited the founders to the January 2009 winter training session of his startup incubator, Y Combinator, which provided them with training and $20,000 in funding in exchange for a 6% interest in the company. With the website already built, they used the Y Combinator investment to fly to New York to meet users and promote the site. They returned to San Francisco with a profitable business model to present to West Coast investors. By March 2009, the site had 10,000 users and 2,500 listings.

In March 2009, the name of the company was shortened to Airbnb.com to eliminate confusion over air mattresses; by then listings included entire rooms and properties.

In April 2009, the company received $600,000 in seed money from Sequoia Capital, with Youniversity Ventures partners Jawed Karim, Keith Rabois, and Kevin Hartz participating. In November 2010, it raised $7.2 million in financing from Greylock Partners and Sequoia Capital in a Series A round, and announced that out of 700,000 nights booked, 80% had occurred in the previous six months.

At the March 2011 South by Southwest conference, Airbnb won the "app" award.

In July 2011, it raised $112 million in financing led by Andreessen Horowitz. Other early investors included Digital Sky Technologies, General Catalyst Partners, and A Grade Investments partners Ashton Kutcher and Guy Oseary.

In October 2011, Airbnb established an office in London, its first international office.

Due to the growth of international end-users, in early 2012, Airbnb opened offices in Paris, Milan, Barcelona, Copenhagen, Moscow, and São Paulo. These openings were in addition to existing offices in San Francisco, London, Hamburg, and Berlin. In September 2013, the company announced that it would establish its European headquarters in Dublin.

In November 2012, Airbnb opened an office in Sydney, its 11th office location, and announced plans to launch the service in Thailand and Indonesia.

In November 2012, Airbnb launched "Neighborhoods", a travel guide of 23 cities that helps travelers choose a neighborhood in which to stay based on certain criteria and personal preferences.

In December 2012, Airbnb opened an office in Singapore.

By October 2013, Airbnb had served 9,000,000 guests since its founding in August 2008. Nearly 250,000 listings were added in 2013.

In April 2014, the company received a $450 million investment from TPG Capital, with the company value estimated to be approximately $10 billion. Additional funding was provided by Andreessen Horowitz, Sequoia Capital, Dragoneer Investment Group, T. Rowe Price, and Sherpa Capital.

In July 2014, Airbnb revealed design revisions to the site and mobile app and introduced a new logo. The logo, called the Bélo, is intended to serve as a symbol of "belonging", and consists of four elements: a head which represents people, a location icon that represents place, a heart to symbolize love, and a letter "A" to stand for the company's name. It also announced a partnership with Concur, an expense reporting service for businesses, to make it easier for business travelers to report Airbnb stays as business expenses.

In April 2015, following the easing of restrictions on U.S. businesses to operate in Cuba, Airbnb expanded to Cuba, making it one of the first U.S. companies to do so.

In June 2015, Airbnb raised $1.5 billion in Series E funding led by General Atlantic, and joined by Hillhouse Capital Group, Tiger Management, Kleiner Perkins Caufield & Byers, GGV Capital, China Broadband Capital, and Horizons Ventures.

In July 2016, former Attorney General Eric Holder was hired to help craft an anti-discrimination policy for Airbnb after reports showed that hosts were refusing to accept lodging requests from guests whose names suggested that they were black. As part of the reform, photos of prospective guests are hidden from hosts until requests for lodging are accepted.

In September 2016, Airbnb raised $555.5 million in funding from Google Capital and Technology Crossover Ventures, valuing the company at $30 billion.

In November 2016, Airbnb launched "experiences", whereby users can use the platform to book activities.

In January 2017, along with serial entrepreneurs Gary Vaynerchuk, Ben Leventhal and Mike Montero, Airbnb led a $13 million investment in Resy, a restaurant reservation-booking app.

In March 2017, Airbnb raised $1 billion in funding, bringing total funding raised to more than $3 billion and valuing the company at $31 billion.

In May 2017, the company launched Airbnbmag, a magazine co-published with Hearst Communications.

Airbnb first became profitable during the second half of 2016. Airbnb's revenue grew more than 80% from 2015 to 2016. After a $200 million profit in 2018, Airbnb posted a loss of $322 million in 2019.

In February 2018, the company announced Airbnb Plus, a collection of homes that have been vetted for quality of services, comfort and design, as well as Beyond by Airbnb, which offers luxury vacation rentals. By October 2019, two million people were staying with Airbnb each night.

In April 2019, Airbnb produced and financed Gay Chorus Deep South, a documentary launched by its Rausch Street Films division. The rights were sold to MTV, which aired the program on its network.

During the COVID-19 pandemic, bookings dropped as much as 96% in some cities. However, bookings rose in many rural areas.

On March 30, 2020, the company pledged $250 million in payouts to host to compensate them for guest cancellations due to the pandemic.

In April 2020, due in part to the decline in business from the pandemic, Airbnb raised $1 billion in equity from private equity firms Silver Lake and Sixth Street Partners at an $18 billion valuation and $1 billion in debt at interest rates of 9%-11.5%.

On May 5, 2020, Brian Chesky sent a memo to all employees announcing the layoff of approximately 1,900 employees, or about 25% of its workforce in the Americas, Europe, and Asia due to the COVID-19 pandemic.

On December 10, 2020, the company became a public company via an initial public offering, raising $3.5 billion. Shares valued at $238 million were offered to hosts on the platform at the price of $68 per share.

In March 2022, Airbnb suspended business in Russia and Belarus due to the sanctions resulting from the 2022 Russian invasion of Ukraine.

In May 2022, Airbnb ceased operations in China. The decision was made primarily because of strict COVID-19 restrictions in China, as well as complicated and expensive laws and regulations that required Airbnb to send detailed information on guests to the Government of China, which can be used to track people. Airbnb was accused of being too willing to provide this information, which led to the resignation of an Airbnb executive, who was also a former deputy director of the Federal Bureau of Investigation, in 2019 after 6 months of working. Airbnb had also been accused of allowing listings on land owned by the Xinjiang Production and Construction Corps, a Chinese state-owned paramilitary entity sanctioned under the Magnitsky Act for involvement in the Uyghur genocide. In 2019, certain hosts in China were accused of discrimination by refusing to rent to Uyghurs.

After temporarily banning parties in homes rented on the platform in August 2020 due to the COVID-19 pandemic, in June 2022, Airbnb announced that it will permanently ban parties and events in homes on its platform, a position supported by hosts and their neighbors who complained of nuisances at Airbnb properties. In August 2022, Airbnb rolled out technology to enforce this ban.

Acquisitions
On May 31, 2011, Airbnb acquired Accoleo, a German competitor. This launched the first international Airbnb office, in Hamburg.

Before the 2012 Summer Olympics, Airbnb acquired London-based rival CrashPadder, subsequently adding 6,000 international listings to its existing inventory. This acquisition made Airbnb the largest lodging website in the United Kingdom.

In November 2012, Airbnb acquired NabeWise, an online city guide that aggregates curated information for specified locations. The acquisition shifted the company's focus toward offering hyperlocal recommendations to travelers.

In December 2012, Airbnb announced the acquisition of Localmind, a location-based question and answer platform.

In September 2015, Airbnb acquired Vamo, and shut down the company, acquiring its employees. It also acquired Lapka.

In September 2016, Airbnb acquired travel activities marketplace Trip4real.

In February 2017, the company acquired Luxury Retreats International, a Canadian-based villa rental company, for approximately $300 million in cash and stock. In February 2017, Airbnb acquired Tilt.com, a social payment startup.

In November 2017, the company acquired Accomable, a startup focused on travel accessibility. It also acquired AdBasis, an advertising technology platform built for A/B testing and multivariate ad testing.

In January 2019, Airbnb acquired Gaest, based in Aarhus, Denmark, which provides a platform for posting and booking venues for meetings and other events.

In March 2019, the company acquired HotelTonight, a website for booking last-minute hotel rooms, for over $400 million.

In August 2019, Airbnb acquired Urbandoor, a global online marketplace that offers extended stays to corporate clients.

Regulations by jurisdiction

Influence on hospitality industry 
Since its founding in 2008, Airbnb has become one of the most successful and valuable start-ups in the world, and has had a significant impact on the industry of renting homes and the hospitality industry more generally.

Airbnb has also had a significant impact on the hospitality industry, particularly in the area of hotels and other traditional accommodation providers, which are often referred to as the HORECA (hotel, restaurant, and catering) industry. Some industry experts believe that Airbnb's rapid growth has disrupted the traditional HORECA model, and has led to a decline in revenue and occupancy rates for traditional hotels in certain markets. Some experts believe Airbnb can overtake Booking.com by revenue.

Controversies and criticism
The company has been criticized for possibly enabling increases in home rents, refusing to provide sensitive customer data to governments, and allowing listings in West Bank settlements. Airbnb has been criticized by the hotel industry for not being subject to fair regulations.

Effects on housing affordability
Several studies have found that long-term rental prices in many areas have increased because landlords have kept properties off the longer-term rental market to instead get higher rental rates for short-term housing via Airbnb. Landlords have also been accused of illegally evicting tenants to convert properties into higher-rent Airbnb listings. A study published in July 2017 found that a 10% increase in Airbnb listings in a given neighborhood corresponds to a 0.42% increase in rents and a 0.76% increase in house prices. A study in 2018 found that in the Lower East Side of Manhattan, full-time listings earned hosts an average of two to three times the median average rent. A study in 2019 by the University of Massachusetts Boston Department of Economics found that with every increase of 12 Airbnb listings per census tract, asking rents increased by 0.4%. Inside Airbnb, a watchdog journalism website, has accused the company of manipulating its data to portray a different result.

Concerns on the effect of Airbnb on housing affordability has resulted in increased lodging regulations and restrictions, which have generally been opposed by Airbnb via lobbying efforts.

Inclusion of listings in Israeli settlements
In November 2018, Airbnb announced that it would remove the approximately 200 "listings in Israeli settlements in the occupied West Bank that are at the core of the dispute between Israelis and Palestinians". However, after affected property owners filed lawsuits against Airbnb in both Israel and the United States alleging discrimination based on place of residence, in April 2019, the company reversed its plans to remove listings in the West Bank and instead promised to donate any profits from these listings to non-profit organizations dedicated to humanitarian aid.

On February 12, 2020, Airbnb was included on a list of companies operating in West Bank settlements involved in activities that "raised particular human rights concerns" published by the United Nations Human Rights Council. The company was categorized under "the provision of services and utilities supporting the maintenance and existence of settlements". The international community considers Israeli settlements built on land occupied by Israel to be in violation of international law.

Objectivity of guest reviews
Airbnb features a review system in which guests and hosts can rate and review each other after a stay. Hosts and guests are unable to see reviews until both have submitted a review or until the time period to review has closed, a system that aims to improve accuracy and objectivity by removing fears that users will receive a negative review in retaliation if they write one. However, the truthfulness and impartiality of reviews may be adversely affected by concerns of future stays because prospective hosts may refuse to host a user who generally leaves negative reviews. The company's policy requires users to forego anonymity, which may also detract from users' willingness to leave negative reviews. These factors may damage the objectivity of the review system.

Response to activities of far-right extremists
In August 2017, Airbnb cancelled numerous bookings and closed accounts belonging to attendees of the white nationalist Unite the Right rally in Charlottesville, Virginia, citing its terms of service in which members must "accept people regardless of their race, religion, national origin, ethnicity, disability, sex, gender identity, sexual orientation, or age." The move was criticized by Jason Kessler, organizer of the rally.

In January 2021, Airbnb was criticized for allowing participants in the January 6 attack on the United States Capitol to book units on the platform in the Washington metropolitan area, despite most hotels in the vicinity of Capitol Hill banning far-right extremists. After the possibility of further violence during the Inauguration of Joe Biden, Airbnb announced the day after the Capitol raid that it was banning all bookings in the region prior to the inauguration.

Sponsorship of 2022 Winter Olympics
Airbnb was one of the 15 leading sponsors of the 2022 Winter Olympics, held in Beijing, and was asked by human rights activists and groups to drop its sponsorship in March 2021 as part of diplomatic and activist boycotts over alleged human rights violations by the Chinese Communist Party, in particular the Uyghur genocide. These requests were ignored by the company.

Length of terms of service agreements
In 2014, linguist Mark Liberman criticized the extreme length of the legal agreements that Airbnb members are required to accept, with the site's terms of service, privacy policy, and other policies amounting to "55081 words, or about the size of a short novel, though much less readable".

Illegal behavior by hosts

Circumvention of European tax regulations by hosts
In October 2020, Luca Poma, an Italian journalist and former advisor to the Italian Minister of Foreign Affairs, alleged in an article that a rental listed on Airbnb was actually operated by a company and not a private individual, circumventing European tax regulations.

Reports of mold, rodents, rapes, and murder at listings
In 2017, analyzing negative guest reviews, a travel blogger found that there are ways for hosts to use fake information to circumvent Airbnb's background checks and that some guests reported being subject to last-minute cancellations, moldy or rodent-infested lodging, theft, invasion of privacy, and even rape and murder. Airbnb responded that the 1,021 incidents reported are statistically insignificant compared to 260 million check-ins at the time and that the company tries to remedy any problems.

Bait-and-switch scams by hosts
A journalist for Vice News reported in October 2019 on a bait-and-switch scam in which a network of fake accounts advertised stays at dozens of properties across eight US cities that once booked was said to be unavailable at the last minute. Substandard alternatives were offered in their place, including to the journalist, refunds were refused, fake positive reviews were left for the fake properties, and negative retaliatory reviews were left for customers who complained. Airbnb closed some of the accounts and the FBI began an investigation in response to the report. A journalist for Wired reported a similar scam in London in February 2020. Airbnb closed the accounts, but Wandsworth Borough Council planning office took no action.

In 2023, Airbnb confirmed to Motherboard that they had begun to ban users from their platform that were found to have a close association with another previously banned user. Users deemed “likely to travel” with these previously banned users are restricted from the platform unless they are able to appeal the ban and prove that they do not have a connection with the banned user, although the Airbnb spokesman did not specify when this practice started or how often it occurs.

Legal disputes

Failure to provide required information to governments
Many governments have passed laws requiring that Airbnb provide guest information so that local regulations can be enforced and hotel taxes are collected. Airbnb contested one such law in New York. However, in May 2019, Airbnb agreed to turn over some anonymized information for approximately 17,000 listings so that the city could pursue illegal rentals. Similar cases were settled in Boston and Miami.

Airbnb refused to provide required information to the Belgian government, claiming the obligation to provide the information was not compatible with European Union law. The Belgian Constitutional Court referred the dispute to the European Court of Justice, which in April 2022 ruled that the requirement to transmit to tax authorities certain particulars of tourist transactions was not contrary to European Union law and referred the case back to the Belgian Constitutional Court.

Legality of service fees in the Netherlands
In March 2020, a subdistrict court ruling in the Netherlands found that Airbnb charging service fees to both the host and the guest was illegal and that the 30,000 people who had rented as guests have a right for reimbursement if they file claims. Airbnb filed countersuits in an attempt to gain clarity on the ruling.

Airbnb.org
Through its airbnb.org 501(c)(3) nonprofit organization, the company offers and facilitates free housing for people affected by natural disasters, including hurricanes and floods, and other emergencies such as the 2022 Russian invasion of Ukraine and the 2021 Taliban offensive. The organization was launched in 2012 after hosts offered free housing to people displaced by Hurricane Sandy.

References

Further reading

External links
 
 

 

2008 establishments in California
2020 initial public offerings
American companies established in 2008
Companies based in San Francisco
Companies listed on the Nasdaq
Hospitality companies of the United States
Hospitality services
Hospitality companies established in 2008
Retail companies established in 2008
Internet properties established in 2008
Multilingual websites
Online marketplaces of the United States

Social planning websites
Vacation rental
Y Combinator companies